Vinessa Lynn Antoine (born July 21, 1983) is a Canadian actress. She is best known for her roles as Judith Winters in the CBC comedy-drama Being Erica (2009-2011), Jordan Ashford in the ABC soap opera General Hospital (2014-18), and Marcie Diggs in the CBC drama Diggstown (2019-2022).

Early life
A native to Toronto, Ontario, Antoine grew up with her younger brother and parents in the suburbs of Toronto. She started studying classical ballet at age 4. At age 18, she studied for three years with the Alvin Ailey American Dance Theater. She also toured with P. Diddy for six months. In her final year at Ailey, Antoine decided to focus her studies on acting. She is of Trinidadian and Middle Eastern descent.

Career
Antoine is best known for her roles on Canadian television. She was a  regular cast member on the CBC  series Being Erica from 2009 to 2011 as Judith Winters. She also had recurring roles on Haven and Heartland. Her other television credits including Soul Food, The Unit and ReGenesis. In 2014, Antoine joined the cast of ABC daytime soap opera, General Hospital as Jordan Ashford. On July 16, 2018, Antoine announced that she was leaving General Hospital.

In 2019, Antoine made history as a first Black Canadian woman to headline Canadian drama series playing lawyer Marcie Diggs in the CBC drama Diggstown. At the 9th Canadian Screen Awards in 2021, and at the 10th Canadian Screen Awards in 2022, she received a nomination for Best Actress in a Drama Series for Diggstown. The series ended in 2022, after fourth seasons. The following year, she had a recurring role in the Netflix comedy-drama series, Ginny & Georgia and was cast opposite Amanda Seyfried in the drama film Seven Veils directed by Atom Egoyan.

Personal life
Antoine is a mother of two boys and lives in Los Angeles, California.

Filmography

References

External links
 
 

1983 births
Living people
21st-century Canadian actresses
Actresses from Toronto
Black Canadian actresses
Canadian film actresses
Canadian people of Jamaican descent
Canadian soap opera actresses
Canadian television actresses